Lieutenant Colonel Cristian A. Bolton (born 10 October 1973) is a Chilean aviator and former fighter pilot in the Chilean Air Force. He was  a competitor and instructor in aerobatics, most notably in the Red Bull Air Race. He is Latin America's leading aerobatic pilot.

Commander Bolton was the leader of the chilean FACH Halcones Acrobatic Team during the years 2013-14.

Results

Red Bull Air Race

References

External links

 
 

1973 births
Living people
Chilean aviators
Red Bull Air Race World Championship pilots
Place of birth missing (living people)